Austrocritonia is a genus of flowering plants in the family Asteraceae.

 Species
The entire genus is endemic to Brazil.
 Austrocritonia angulicaulis (Sch.Bip. ex Baker) R.M.King & H.Rob. - Bahia, Espirito Santo, Minas Gerais, Rio de Janeiro, São Paulo
 Austrocritonia rosea (Gardner) R.M.King & H.Rob. - Rio de Janeiro
 Austrocritonia taunayana (Glaz. ex B.L.Rob.) R.M.King & H.Rob.	 - Rio de Janeiro
 Austrocritonia velutina (Gardner) R.M.King & H.Rob. - Minas Gerais, Rio de Janeiro, São Paulo, Paraná

References

Endemic flora of Brazil
Eupatorieae
Asteraceae genera